Orlando Aliro Ramírez Vera (7 May 1943 – 26 July 2018) was a Chilean football forward who played for Chile in the 1966 FIFA World Cup. He also played for Universidad Católica and Palestino.

Honours
Universidad Católica
 Chilean Primera División: 1961

References

External links

1943 births
2018 deaths
Chilean footballers
Chile international footballers
Association football forwards
1966 FIFA World Cup players
Footballers from Santiago